Lincoln County is a county located in the U.S. state of North Carolina. As of the 2020 census, the population was 86,810. Its county seat is Lincolnton. Lincoln County is included in the Charlotte-Concord-Gastonia, NC-SC Metropolitan Statistical Area.

History
The county was formed in 1779 from the eastern part of Tryon County, which had been settled by Europeans in the mid-18th Century. It was named for Benjamin Lincoln, a general in the American Revolutionary War." During the American Revolution, the Battle of Ramsour's Mill occurred near a grist mill in Lincolnton.

In 1782 the southeastern part of Burke County was annexed to Lincoln County. In 1841, parts of Lincoln County and Rutherford County were combined to form Cleveland County. In 1842, the northern third of Lincoln County became Catawba County. In 1846, the southern half of what was left of Lincoln County became Gaston County.

Geography

State and local protected areas 
 Mountain Island Educational State Forest (part)
 Pee Wee's Mountain Bike Trail
 Rock Springs Nature Preserve
 South Fork Rail Trail

Major water bodies 
 Anderson Creek
 Ballard Creek
 Buffalo Creek
 Catawba River
 Crooked Creek
 Howard Creek
 Hoyle Creek
 Indian Creek
 Killian Creek
 Lake Norman
 Little Indian Creek
 South Fork Catawba River
 Tanyard Creek

Adjacent counties
 Catawba County - north
 Iredell County - northeast
 Mecklenburg County - southeast
 Gaston County - south
 Cleveland County - west
 Burke County - northwest

Major highways

 
 
 
 
  (Business route)
 
 
  (Truck route)

Major infrastructure 
 Lincoln County Airport

Demographics

2020 census

As of the 2020 United States census, there were 86,810 people, 34,418 households, and 24,445 families residing in the county.

2010 census
As of the census of 2010, there were 78,265 people, 30,343 households, and 22,221 families residing in the county.  The population density was 261.76 people per square mile (101/km2). There were 33,641 housing units at an average density of 112.51 per square mile (43.46/km2). The racial makeup of the county was 89.4% White, 5.5% Black or African American, 0.3% Native American, 0.5% Asian, 0.02% Pacific Islander, 2.7% from other races, and 1.6% from two or more races. 6.7% of the population were Hispanic or Latino of any race.

There were 30,343 households, out of which 30.6% had children under the age of 18 living with them, 57.2% were married couples living together, 11.1% had a female householder with no husband present, and 26.8% were non-families. 22.3% of all households were made up of individuals, and 8.4% had someone living alone who was 65 years of age or older.  The average household size was 2.56 and the average family size was 2.97.

In the county, the population was spread out, with 23.6% under the age of 18, 7.5% from 18 to 24, 26.2% from 25 to 44, 29.5% from 45 to 64, and 13.2% who were 65 years of age or older. The median age was 40.4 years. For every 100 females there were 98.4 males.  For every 100 females age 18 and over, there were 95.8 males.

The median income for a household in the county was $42,456, and the median income for a family was $48,298. Males had a median income of $41,441 versus $30,480 for females. The per capita income for the county was $21,861.  About 10.4% of families and 15.8% of the population were below the poverty line, as well as 25.3% of those under age 18 and 8.7% of those age 65 or over.

Government and politics

Lincoln County is a member of the regional Centralina Council of Governments.

Controversy 
In February 2020, the Lincoln County Sheriff's Department received media attention when surveillance video was released showing first a pair of Atrium Health security guards assaulting a sixteen-year-old boy brought to the hospital's emergency room. When another pair of sheriff's deputies arrived, video shows one of the deputies hitting the boy, now handcuffed, in the face twice as the boy spit blood pooling in his mouth after being tackled from behind by security guards. The deputy then aggressively approached the mother, yelling at her before being pulled to the ground by a second deputy,  In an interview with WBTV, Lincoln County Sheriff Bill Beam defended his deputies saying they did nothing wrong, denying that the officer struck the boy or that the officer was physically restrained by two additional sheriff's deputies. The boy was arrested and charged with felony assault on a police officer.

Education

Post-secondary education
 Gaston College - Community College located in Dallas, North Carolina with a satellite campus in Lincolnton offering associate degree, Certificate, and Diploma programs.

Lincoln County Schools

High schools
 East Lincoln High School
 Lincoln County School of Technology
 Lincolnton High School
 Newbold High School (1952-1968), a segregated school that served African Americans and became G. E. Massey Elementary School in 1968 after desegregation
 Oaklawn High School (segregated school serving African Americans), replaced by Newbold High School in 1952
 North Lincoln High School
 West Lincoln High School

Middle school 
 Asbury Academy 
 East Lincoln
 Lincolnton
 North Lincoln
 West Lincoln

Intermediate schools
 Pumpkin Center Intermediate School

Elementary schools
 Asbury
 Battleground
 Catawba Springs
 G. E. Massey
 Iron Station
 Love Memorial
 Norris S. Childers
 North Brook
 Pumpkin Center Primary
 Rock Springs
 S. Ray Lowder
 St. James
 Union

Charter schools
 Lincoln Charter School

Communities

City
 Lincolnton (county seat and largest city)

Town
 Maiden (part)

Census-designated places
 Denver
 Iron Station
 Lowesville
 Westport

Unincorporated communities
 Boger City
 Laurel Hill
 Polkadot
 Toluca (part)
 Vale
 Crouse

Townships
 Catawba Springs
 Howards Creek
 Ironton
 Lincolnton
 North Brook

See also
 List of counties in North Carolina
 National Register of Historic Places listings in Lincoln County, North Carolina
 List of North Carolina state forests
 Lincoln Theatre Guild

References

Further reading
 Agosta, Carolyn Steele, "Two Weeks Every Summer, Stories from Camp Meeting", short stories inspired by Rock Spring Camp Meeting, Denver, NC, and Lincoln County, NC. https://www.carolynsteeleagosta.com

External links

 
 
 NCGenWeb Lincoln County - free genealogy resources for the county

 
1779 establishments in North Carolina
Populated places established in 1779